Glyphidocera hamatella is a moth in the family Autostichidae. It was described by Adamski and Brown in 2001. It is found in Venezuela.

The length of the forewings is 7.1–8 mm. The forewing colour consists of brown scales tipped with pale brown intermixed with brown and some dark-brown scales. There are two brown discal spots, one large spot, the other small, near the distal end of the cell. The marginal scales are dark brown. The hindwings are pale brown.

Etymology
The species name refers to the hooklike apical area of the costa of the valva and is derived from Latin hamatus (meaning hooked).

References

Moths described in 2001
Taxa named by David Adamski
Glyphidocerinae